Kirandul is a town and a municipality in Dantewada district in the Indian state of Chhattisgarh. It is located roughly 400 km south of Raipur, capital of Chhattisgarh and 41 km southwest of Dantewada-the district headquarters. The way to travel is by road with frequent bus service from Raipur, Bhilai and Jagdalpur or by train from Jagdalpur and Visakhapatnam.

Demographics
As of 2011 India census, Kirandul had a population of 18887 of which 9776 are males while 9111 are females as per report released by Census India 2011.

Population of children with age of 0-6 is 2317 which is 12.27% of total population of Kirandul M). In Kirandul Municipality, Female Sex Ratio is of 932 against state average of 991. Moreover child sex ratio in Kirandul is around 1015 compared to Chhattisgarh state average of 969. Literacy rate of Kirandul town is 73.7% - higher than state average of 71.04%. In Kirandul, male literacy is around 79.9% while female literacy rate is 67.02%.

Region
This region is basically a plateau. The Bailadila Range of hills are located at a distance of about 41 km south west of Dantewada, the district headquarters in Chhattisgarh State.

Rising to a height of 1,276 m, one of the hills of the Bailadila Range is the highest point in the state of Chhattisgarh. Bailadila has been established as an industrial area that has been divided into two towns, namely Bade Bacheli (29 kilometers from Dantewada) & Kirandul (41 kilometers from Dantewada).

Climate
 
Bailadila region enjoys mild summer and winter is not severe. The maximum temperature in summer rises up to 40 degree Celsius between May and June whereas minimum temperature in winter drops to 10 degree Celsius. The area receives heavy rains during monsoon from June to October. Weather during rainy season is stormy accompanied by gales and the hilltops are covered with thick clouds and dense fog, which reduces visibility.

History
The commercial discovery of Bailadila dates back to 1955-56 when Prof. Euemura of Japanese Steel Mills Association, studying the memoirs of Geological Survey of India, drew the attention of the Japanese Steel Mills to the richness of the vast deposits of iron ore and its proximity to the Eastern Coast of India. Later an agreement had been signed with the Japanese Steel Mills in 1960. An approval of the project report prepared by NMDC was given in 1964 and the Mine Plant had been inaugurated on November 1968. Later on, National Mineral Development Corporation, with help of Japan set up the first iron ore plant in Kirandul. Currently  Japan is the biggest purchaser of its ore, but earlier it has also sold ore in Bhilai Steel Plant too.

Kirandul was a crucial part of the princely state of Bastar before India attained independence. Bastar region prospered under the reign of King Annama Deva, the brother of Kakatiya king Pratapa Rudra Deva of Warangal (Telangana). During the 19th century, the region came under the administration of the British rule. Eventually, it was acceded to the Indian Union on January 1, 1948, and the town became a part of the Bastar district of Madhya Pradesh and later in 2000, it was included in the newly formed Chhattisgarh state.

Economy

The iron ore mines here are also an important tourist attraction. Run by the Navratna Government Organization,'NMDC', these mines operate with the latest technology and hi-tech machinery. However, one needs to obtain permit to visit the mines, which can be done by requesting the NMDC office. The mines are generally open to the public on Vishwakarma Puja day every year and huge number of people visit during that time.

The Bailadila iron ore range extends for a length of 40 km with a width of about 10 km mostly along the top of hill, which constitute one of the richest concentration of iron-ore of world. The range contains 1200 million tonnes of high grade iron ore distributed in 14 deposits. 14 reserves have been discovered, of which 3 are being mined. Deposit 14/11C and 11B are the mines located in Kirandul complex while Deposit 5, 10 and 11A are located in Bacheli complex of Bailadila Iron ore mines. Bailadila Deposit-14 mine is the first large scale open cast mechanised iron ore mine in India for which DPR was prepared by NMDC and was commissioned in April, 1968.Bailadila Deposit-11C was commissioned in June, 1988. The ore is exported through Visakhapatnam Port.

The entire area was brought to the mainstream of civilisation by the spectacular effort of NMDC by opening-up of mines. Today, Bailadila is a name to reckon within the world iron ore market because of its super high-grade iron ore. Bailadila complex possesses the world’s best grade of hard lumpy ore having +66% iron content, free from sulphur and other deleterious material and the best physical properties needed for steel making. Essar Steel Slurry beneficiation plant is situated in Kirandul which is used to transport iron ore through Slurry pipeline to Essar Steel pellet plant facility in Visakhapatnam. It has its own helipad for personal usage. At 267 km, the Kirandul-Vizag pipeline is the longest Slurry pipeline in India.

Transport
Kirandul is easily accessible and well connected to Raipur, Visakhapatnam and Hyderabad by all-weather roads. It can also be reached by rail from Visakhapatnam. There is regular iron ore movement from this sector to Visakhapatnam port by rail.

Rail Transport

The Kothavalasa–Kirandul line of East Coast Railway from Kirandul to Visakhapatnam via Koraput is laid through the Eastern Ghats. Up to Araku station, it has many tunnels. Also it pass through the highest elevation Broad gauge station in the Eastern ghats, Semiliguda, just before the Borra caves. Kirandul - Kottavalasa Railroad is the record high Broad Gauge line in the Eastern Ghats. The KK Line has the distinction of being the second highest broad gauge railway line in the country after the one in Jammu.

A line from Bailadila to Visakhapatnam via Jagdalpur is in place mainly for the purposes of evacuation of iron ore by National Mineral Development Corporation (NMDC) from Kirandul with limited passenger trains. Plans are underway for doubling the railway line from Bailadila to Jagdalpur. The cost of this is projected to be about INR 870 crore which is proposed to be initially borne by NMDC and NMDC will in turn get a rebate in the freight from Indian Railways towards the initial cost incurred by NMDC.

Air transport
There is an airport at Jagdalpur where until recent years no scheduled services were run to or from here. This changed with the inauguration of flight services by Chhattisgarh CM Bhupesh Baghel in 2020 thereby giving Jagdalpur the privilege of having the second civil airport in the State. Although several attempts were made earlier in 2018 for flights to Bhubhaneshwar and Raipur, the project was not successful and was discontinued. Maa Danteshwari Airport in Jagdalpur has flights operated by Alliance Air to Raipur and Hyderabad where the travel time is 45 minutes and 75 minutes respectively. This is in contrast to the travel time by roadways of 7 hours and 12 hours respectively to the destinations thereby saving a considerable amount of time

The airport was predominantly used by political leaders and insurgency operation-related activities by the army and the police. With the recent developments, the airport will serve the population of the nearby districts well and would act as a means of promoting tourism in the State. The airport also helped in boosting the vaccination programme against Covid-19 as the various medical equipment and medicines were conveniently transported.   The other nearest airports are Raipur Airport in the capital city of Raipur and Visakhapatnam Airport, Andhra Pradesh.

References

External links
 Official website Dantewada district
NMDC Limited Official website

Further reading

 

Cities and towns in Dantewada district
Iron ore mining in India
Townships in India